The 2010–11 B Group was the 56th season of the Bulgarian B Football Group, the second tier of the Bulgarian football league system. The season started on 31 July 2010 and finished in May 2011 with the A Group promotion play-off.

On 3 June the Executive Committee of Bulgarian Football Union decided to reduce the number of teams in both West and East B PFG due to the licensing problems that occurred in the last 5 years. The new format will consist 12 teams in each group playing three times during the season. The draw for the third matches will be conducted after Round 22 based in the Berger tables. The same principles were used in the first level football leagues in Macedonia and Montenegro.

There is also change regarding the A Group promotion play-off. Since this season it will be played in two stages. The first will be the match between the runners-up from the East and West B PFG. The final stage will be played between the 14th finished team from A Group and the winner from the first stage.

Team changes from 2009–10

Movement between A Group and B Group
The champions of the two B Group 2009/10 divisions were promoted to the A Group 2010/11. These were Kaliakra Kavarna (East) and Vidima-Rakovski Sevlievo (West).

Lokomotiv Mezdra, Sportist Svoge and Botev Plovdiv were relegated from A Group 2009/10 after finishing in the bottom three places. Botev and Lokomotiv did not even receive license for the B Group, so they will participate in 2010-11 V AFG

Movement between B Group and third-level leagues
Rodopa Smolyan and Belite Orli Pleven declared bankruptcy during the winter break and so relegated from respectively East B PFG and West B PFG. Bdin Vidin finished in 15th place in West B PFG and relegated to the Bulgarian North-West V AFG.

The relegated teams were replaced by teams from the third-level leagues of the Bulgarian league pyramid and allocated to one of the two divisions. Dorostol Silistra as winners of a North-East V AFG and Ravda as winners of South-East V AFG joined the Eastern division. Malesh Mikrevo as winners of South-West V AFG and Chavdar Byala Slatina as winners of North-West V AFG were included to the Western division.

On 20 July AKB Minyor Radnevo declared that their financial status would not be secured, so they were removed from East B PFG. It is not clear what the future of AKB Minyor would be. On 27 July the Executive committee of Bulgarian Football Union decided that the new member of East B PFG will be FC Razgrad 2000. At the same time FC Razgrad renamed themselves and from this season they will be PFC Ludogorets Razgrad.

Reducing the size of the divisions
Because of the reducing the size of the divisions, some teams from both East and West B Group lost their license. The teams of Spartak Varna, Volov Shumen, Svilengrad and Botev Plovdiv, which should play in East B PFG this season, did not receive professional license and so were relegated to the next division levels. The same is the case with the following teams from West B PFG - Marek Dupnitsa, Balkan Botevgrad, Rislki Sportist Samokov and Lokomotiv Mezdra.

East B Group

Stadia and locations

League table

Top goalscorers

Source: Soccerway

West B Group

Stadia and locations

League table

Top goalscorers

Source: Soccerway

Promotion play-off

References 

Second Professional Football League (Bulgaria) seasons
2010–11 in Bulgarian football
Bulgaria